Laamanen is a Finnish surname. Notable people with the surname include:

 Anu Laamanen (born 1958), Finnish diplomat
 Elmeri Laamanen (born 1994), Finnish professional ice hockey player
 Jukka Laamanen (born 1976), Finnish professional ice hockey player

Finnish-language surnames